Miles Barber (1733–1786+) was an English slave-trader from Lancaster who established a factory at Factory Island, Îles de Los.

Barber set up his factory in 1755.

References

British slave traders
1733 births
1786 deaths